Кој сака да биде милионер? (English translation: Who wants to be a millionaire?, transliteration: Koj saka da bide milioner?) is a Macedonian game show based on the original British format of Who Wants to Be a Millionaire?. The show is hosted by Sašo Macanovski-Trendo. The main goal of the game is to win 4 million MKD (earlier 3 million) by answering 15 multiple-choice questions correctly. There are three lifelines - Fifty Fifty, Phone A Friend and Ask The Audience. Кој сака да биде милионер? originally aired in 2004. It is broadcast on the Macedonian TV station A1. When a contestant gets the fifth question correct, he is guaranteed to leave with at least 5,000 MKD. When a contestant gets the tenth question correct, he is guaranteed to leave with at least 125,000 MKD (earlier 100,000 MKD).

Nobody won the top prize, but a contestant on November 29, 2009 won 2,000,000 MKD after answering 14 questions correctly.

The game's prizes

References

Who Wants to Be a Millionaire?
2004 Macedonian television series debuts
2009 Macedonian television series endings
Macedonian television series
A1 Televizija original programming

cs:Milionář (televizní soutěž)
mk:Кој сака да биде милионер